Ali Mufuruki (1959 – December 7, 2019) was a Tanzanian businessman, author, founder and board member of several organisations. He was the founder of Infotech Investment Group, founding chairman of CEO Roundtable of Tanzania and Africa Leadership Initiative (ALI) East Africa, board chairman of Vodacom Tanzania and Wananchi Group Holdings, trustee of the Mandela Institute for Development Studies (MINDS) and co-author of the book Tanzania's Industrialization Journey, 2016–2056.

He died on 7 December 2019 Saturday at the Morningside Hospital in Johannesburg, South Africa.

References

1959 births
2019 deaths
Tanzanian businesspeople
Tanzanian engineers
Reutlingen University alumni
Henry Crown Fellows